Della Porta is an Italian surname. It may refer to:

Antonella Della Porta (1927–2002), Italian actress
Antonio della Porta (died 1702), Swiss Baroque architect
Ardicino della Porta, iuniore (1434–1493), Italian Roman Catholic bishop and cardinal
Bianca Della Porta (born 1991), Canadian ice hockey and rugby player
Donatella della Porta (born 1956), Italian sociologist and political scientist
Giacomo della Porta (1532–1602), Italian architect and sculptor
Giambattista della Porta (1535–1615), Italian scholar, polymath and playwright
Glauco Della Porta (1920–1976), Italian politician and economist
Guglielmo della Porta (died 1577), Italian architect and sculptor
Guiduccio della Porta (died 1423), Roman Catholic prelate